The Hutt by-election was a by-election in the New Zealand electorate of Hutt, an urban seat at the bottom of the North Island. The by-election was held on 18 December 1929, and was precipitated by the resignation of sitting United member of parliament Thomas Wilford on who had been appointed the High Commissioner to the United Kingdom by Prime Minister Joseph Ward. The by-election was contested by Walter Nash of the Labour Party, James Kerr from the United Party and Harold Johnston of the Reform Party. The lead up to the by-election was marred by harsh words between candidates.

Candidates and selection process

Labour Party
Nash came a respectable second to Wilford and was seen as well capable of winning the seat. He was the current General Secretary of the Labour Party and was thus well known. Local newspaper The Hutt News (part owned by another candidate James Kerr) printed several articles through the campaigning attempting to discredit Nash as a Soviet-style socialist. Peter Fraser served as the campaign organiser, and Mark Fagan was Nash's election secretary. Just as the campaign was about to begin, a local businessman named Nash had been recently divorced and rumours spread that it was Walter Nash. To quell this canard Nash's advertisements featured him alongside his family. The pamphlet featured a portrait of him wearing glasses appearing as (according to his biographer) "... as a bespectacled and possibly severe man, looking more like a schoolmaster than a Labour agitator."

United Party
James Kerr, a resident of Petone, was be the official United Party candidate in the election. He was the son of James Kerr, a former member of the Legislative Council. At the time Kerr was the proprietor of the Hutt and Petone Chronicle newspaper, a position he had held since 1912. He previously resided in Greymouth serving as the proprietor of the Grey River Argus.  In  he stood for the Grey seat against Speaker of the House, Arthur Guinness, being defeated by a small majority. Outgoing MP Thomas Wilford and his wife campaigned intensely on Kerr's behalf. Kerr was a member of the Petone Fire Board, an associate of the Petone Borough Council, President of the Petone Chamber of Commerce, and a member of the Hutt Valley High School Board of Governors. He was one of the foundation members of the United Party, and at the time a member of the executive and had been chairman of Wilford's election committee.

Reform Party
Harold Johnston was chosen as the Reform Party candidate for the contest. Johnston was a respected lawyer and the fourth son of Charles Johnston, former MP for Te Aro and Speaker of the Legislative Council. Earlier that year the position of Chief Justice was offered to Johnston upon the death of Charles Skerrett, but he declined the offer, with Michael Myers becoming the next Chief Justice instead. Johnston was well known as an able speaker and he was regularly able to draw large crowds to his meetings. Reverend Richard Hobday wrote from Auckland rather critically of Johnston stating "What a weird looking creature Johnston is! He looks exactly like one of the vultures in our Zoo here!" Nash replied, writing more charitably of Johnston. The New Zealand Worker mused that while Johnston had been educated at Wanganui Collegiate School and Oxford University which had "left him with the attractive personality of a graduate of these institutions" but thinking him a Reform member by association rather than genuine conviction.

Independent
Mr. H Bennett announced his candidacy as an Independent. He proposed to stand in the interests of the country itself, rather than of any particular political party. Bennett was concerned that New Zealand could be 'handed over' to Socialism by a minority vote given the increasing competition for right wing votes by United and Reform. With candidate from both parties standing Bennett was not ignorant of the fact that he too was helping to split the anti-Labour vote, but claimed his hopes were that both would withdraw their candidates in favour of himself. However, his plea fell on deaf ears with United wanting to retain their seat and Reform seeking to supersede United in seats. As a result, Bennett withdrew and hoped either Kerr or Johnston would prevail.

Campaign
Dozens of meetings were held and speeches made by the three candidates. Many high-profile figures spoke on behalf of the candidates as well, Harry Holland, James McCombs & Michael Joseph Savage for Nash, Thomas Wilford & Harry Atmore for Kerr and both Gordon Coates & William Downie Stewart Jr for Johnston.

At Nash's first meeting, held at the Petone Labour Hall, the power cut out and Nash was forced to speak to the crowd for an hour and forty minutes by candlelight. Despite this the hall was full and audience was enthusiastic. At several of Nash's subsequent meetings he had trouble with interjectors from the Junior Reform League. The most infamous was when a fleet of motor cars was used to take Junior Reform members from Wellington to noisily drive past a meeting at Day's Bay. One of them questioned Nash's loyalty to the Crown, and a vote of confidence in him at the meeting's end was lost by a large majority due to the Junior Reformers presence.

Johnston claimed that Labour wanted to confiscate private land, would probably raise interest rates, repudiate interest payments on accounts with the Post Office Savings Bank and that privately-owned shops in Moera 'would be taken over by the State'. Nash strongly denied all these allegations. At one of Johnston's meetings interjectors denouncing the Reform Party because "They put us in a swamp", referring to the local unemployed being given low paying relief work, worth only "nine bob a day." The meeting concluded with cheers for Nash and Labour leader Harry Holland rather than Johnston.

Election results
The following table gives the election results:

When the results were announced on election night, Nash spoke to a crowd from the mayoral office in Upper Hutt, saying that the harsh words on the campaign should be forgotten and all should work together for good and received cheers from those in attendance. The Wellington newspaper The Evening Post wrote that Nash would likely be a moderating influence on Labour policy owing to his experience as a business owner (a rarity among Labour politicians at this time).

Notes

References

Hutt 1929
1929 elections in New Zealand
1929 Hutt by-election
Politics of the Wellington Region
1920s in Wellington